The  series (typically localized as River City) is a video game series started by Technōs Japan. The series is now handled by Arc System Works who purchased all of the intellectual property rights from Technōs' successor, Million Corp. The first game in the series is fully titled , which roughly translates to "Hot Blood Tough Guy Kunio", with Nekketsu being the name of the series' title character Kunio's high school. The kun suffix after his name is an informal Japanese honorific usually applied to young males. The series originated in arcades, before appearing on the Famicom console. Kunio later became Technōs Japan's main mascot, appearing on the company's logo in several games and television commercials.

A few of the early Kunio games for the NES were localized for the North American market. These include Renegade, River City Ransom, Super Dodge Ball, Crash 'n' the Boys: Street Challenge and Nintendo World Cup, which are heavily "Americanized" versions of the Kunio-kun games. Technōs Japan has released over twenty Kunio-kun titles for the Famicom, Game Boy, and Super Famicom in Japan. In addition, licensed ports of the games were made for other platforms such as the PC-Engine (through Naxat Soft), Mega Drive (through Pal Soft) and the X68000 (through Sharp).

Development
The original game Nekketsu Kōha Kunio-kun was created by Yoshihisa Kishimoto. He pitched a semi-autobiographical game based on his teenage high school years, with the protagonist Kunio-kun loosely based on himself. Kishimoto recalled his experiences as a high school student regularly getting into fights on a daily basis, which was partly triggered by a break-up with a girl who dumped him. Kishimito was also a fan of Bruce Lee's Hong Kong martial arts films, particularly Enter the Dragon (1973). He combined elements from Lee's Enter the Dragon with that of his own life to create the concept for Nekketsu Kōha Kunio-kun. He went on to design Double Dragon (1987), which was originally envisioned as a direct sequel to the original Kunio-Kun game, before becoming a new game with a different cast and setting.

The game's title and its protagonist, Kunio (variously renamed "Alex" and "Crash Cooney" in the United States), were named after Technōs Japan's former president, Kunio Taki. Many of the later games in the Kunio-kun series, particularly those under the Downtown Nekketsu moniker, were the handiwork of two men: Mitsuhiro "Yoshimitsu" Yoshida and Hiroyuki "Mokeke" Sekimoto.

Renegade, the Western localization of Nekketsu Kōha Kunio-kun, spawned its own separate spin-off series developed by British company Ocean Software for home computers. There were two Renegade sequels: Target: Renegade (1988) and Renegade III: The Final Chapter (1989).

List of games

Characters
The following is a list of characters appearing in most of the games, ordered by the games where they first appear.

Main characters

  (full name  in live-action series) – the protagonist of the series. Kunio serves as the guardian of Nekketsu High School against rival schools and is the captain of his school's Dodgeball team, although he excels at other sports (such as soccer and ice hockey). Kunio first appears in the original Nekketsu Renegade Kunio-kun, where he is described as a second year student at Nekketsu High School (in the Downtown Nekketsu sub-series, he is described as a third year student, establishing a loose continuity between later games). His surname is never revealed, but the live-action television series lists his surname as Fu'unji. In some games (such as Nekketsu Hockey Club and Baseball Monogatari), he is the only student at Nekketsu to wear an all-white uniform, while at other games everyone at Nekketsu wears white. In the localized versions, he is known as a nameless vigilante in Renegade (Mr. K in the NES version), Sam in Super Dodge Ball, Alex in River City Ransom and some of its ports, and "Crash" Cooney in Crash 'n the Boys: Street Challenge. While the protagonist of the series, Kunio also later became Technōs Japan's main mascot, appearing on the company's logo in several games and television commercials. Kunio is voiced by Ryō Horikawa in most of the games, Hiroyuki Satō in Dodgeball Bu: CD Soccer Hen, and Satoru Murakami in Stay Cool, Kobayashi-san!. Takurō Ōno plays Kunio in the live-action series.
  – often described as Kunio's eternal rival, Riki is the guardian of Hanazono High School and the second most recurring character in the series. In the original Nekketsu Renegade Kunio-kun, Riki appears as the first stage boss and serves as captain of the Hanazono dodgeball team. Downtown Nekketsu Story was the first game where Riki teams-up with Kunio (although chronologically speaking, Shodai comes first). Since then, Riki's relationship with Kunio evolved from enmity to close friendship, and he appears in the later beat-em-ups as a secondary playable character. Riki's birthdate is on May 5 and is repeating his third year in the Downtown Nekketsu sub-series. In the localized versions, he is known as Jack in Renegade and Super Dodge Ball, Ryan in River City Ransom, and Crusher in Crash 'n the Boys: Street Challenge. Riki is voiced by Nobutoshi Canna in PC Engine version of Downtown Nekketsu Monogatari and Masaaki Okura in Nekketsu Dodgeball Densetsu. In the live-action series, he is played by Yukihiro Takiguchi.

  – A Nekketsu High student and manager of its Soccer Club, introduced in Nekketsu High School Dodge Ball Club: Soccer Story (Nintendo World Cup) when she turns to Kunio for help after some of her teammates got hospitalized from food poisoning. In Kunio-tachi no Banka, she is Kunio's fighting partner and one-time love interest. She is one of the two protagonists of River City Girls. Misako is voiced by Yumi Tōma in Dodgeball Bu: CD Soccer Hen, Kayli Mills in River City Girls, and played by Kaho Takashima in the live-action series.

   - A Hanazono High student and Misako’s best friend, introduced in Kunio-tachi no Banka as  Riki's fighting partner and one-time love interest. She is one of the two protagonists of River City Girls, where she was voiced by Kira Buckland.

Sanwakai
The  are a ruthless Yakuza gang that serve as the series antagonists.

 Sabu: The Sanwakai head, he is introduced as a gun-wielding final boss in the original Nekketsu Renegade Kunio-kun. He returns as the main antagonist in Kunio-tachi no Banka, where he recruits his adiopted son Ken to frame Kunio for a hit and run accident. In Nekketsu Kōha Kunio-Kun SP: Rantō Kyōsōkyoku (River City: Tokyo Rumble), Sabu orchestrates a plan to conquer Tokyo and get revenge on Kunio for defeating him in the past by establishing the "Tokyo Lion Alliance". He is also a playable character in the Neo Geo version of Super Dodge Ball. Sabu is the only character not to change his name, nor his appearance, in Renegade. Sabu is voiced by Yukimasa Kishino in Nekketsu Dodgeball Densetsu. In the River City Girls games, he is revealed to have a daughter named Sabuko and becomes the antagonist of River City Girls 2
 Ken: Sabu's adopted son who is introduced in Kunio-tachi no Banka, helping his father with his resemblance to Kunio to frame the latter for a hit-and-run accident that landed the real Kunio and Riki in jail before they escape and clear their names. In the River City Girls games, where he is voiced by Todd Haberkorn, Ken is hostile towards his sister Sabuko while helping their father take over the town and make the protagonists' lives miserable.
 Sabuko: The daughter of Sabu who is introduced in River City Girls, a martial artist armed with a katana and magic. Sabuko initially leads the Sanwakai during her father's imprisonment until he escape prison upon learned that she lost to Misako and Kyōko.

Nekketsu Renegade Kunio-kun (Renegade)
  – Hiroshi is Kunio's best friend in the original Nekketsu Renegade Kunio-kun game. He enrolls into Nekketsu High School during his second year and gets picked on a lot by bullies. He becomes fast friends with Kunio after Kunio defends him from his tormentors. In the arcade version of Nekketsu Renegade Kunio-kun, he is beaten by a different gang at the beginning of each time, whereas in the Famicom he is kidnapped by Sabu (with no explanation given). In addition to the Nekketsu Renegade sub-series, he appears as a member of the Dodgeball Club in Dodgeball Club, as well as in Soccer Story and Hockey Club, where he shares the same sprite as the Sonokawa character from the Downtown Nekketsu sub-series (until he receives a new sprite in Kunio-kun Special). Actor Kōsuke Hatakeyama plays Hiroshi in the live-action series. He is the only character not to appear in the American versions of the Renegade games.
 Shinji – the leader of a bōsōzoku gang known as "Yokohama Funky" in Nekketsu Renegade Kunio-kun (where he is the second stage boss) and the "Blue Emperor" in Kunio-tachi no Banka (where he is a recurring boss). He also appears as a playable character in the Neo Geo version of Super Dodge Ball as well as in River City: Tokyo Rumble. His counterpart in Renegade is named Joel. Shinji is voiced by Hisao Egawa in Nekketsu Dodgeball Densetsu.
 Misuzu – a giant sukeban from the all-girl Taiyō Academy, first appearing as a stage 3 boss in Nekketsu Renegade Kunio-kun. She reappears as Sabu's bodyguard in Kunio-tachi no Banka, a stage 1 boss in River City Girls, and is a playable character in the Neo Geo version of Super Dodge Ball and in River City: Tokyo Rumble. Her counterpart in Renegade is named Kim. Misuzu is voiced by Keiko Yamamoto in Nekketsu Dodgeball Densetsu. Shu Hamada plays Misuzu in the live-action series.
 Tadokoro (田所) – an original character from the live-action series. A student of Nekketsu High for many decades, he leads a small group of delinquents who constantly harass Hiroshi until they are all defeated by Kunio. He is played by comedian Donpei Tsuchihara.

Nekketsu High School Dodge Ball Club (Super Dodge Ball)
 Shinichi
 Kōji – in Kunio-kun Special, Koji is the captain of Nekketsu High's Soccer Team, but would later surrender his position to Kunio. He reappears in Shodai Nekketu Kouha Kunio-kun as among the students visiting Osaka.
 Mitsuhiro
 Heilman – captain of the Iceland team.
 Njomo – captain of the Kenya team.
 Moldoff – captain of the USSR team who debuted in the Famicom version of Dodgeball Club.

Downtown Nekketsu Story (River City Ransom)
  (Cyndi in River City Ransom) – Mami is a 2nd Year High School Student of Hanazono High and its team's cheerleader. In River City Ransom, she is Riki's girlfriend who is kidnapped by Yamada when he and his gang took over River City. She also serves as a nemesis of Kyoko in River City Girls, voiced by Sarah Anne Williams.
  (Roxy in River City Ransom) – Hasebe is a 3rd Year Student Vice President of Reihou Academy and Yamada's girlfriend, warning Kunio and Riki of the Hattori Twins. In Downtown Nekketsu Baseball Monogatari, she plays as the sports commentator for the game. It is said that she, Kunio, and Yamada used to attend the same school together before Kunio transferred to Nekketsu High. She also serves as Misako's nemesis in River City Girls, voiced by Cristina Valenzuela.
  (Harry in River City Ransom, Conan in River City Ransom EX) – 2nd Year student of Senridai High School. In an effort to make a name for himself and his school, he attacks Hanazono High, but is constantly defeated by Riki. In other Kunio-kun games, he plays as Kunio's sidekick.
  (Moose in River City Ransom) – self-proclaimed No. 2 man of Hakutaka Industry High School. He is the game's first boss.
  (Rocko in River City Ransom, Baldy in Crash 'n the Boys: Street Challenge) – the No. 1 man of Hakutaka Industries High School. Despite his plump size and wearing large glasses, Nishimura is a formidable fighter.
  (Thor in River City Ransom, Monty in Crash 'n the Boys: Street Challenge) – leader of the "Four Devas" (Zombies in the English version), a group of some of the most feared fighters from Reihou Academy under Onizuka. He is the main character in spin-off Stay Cool, Kobayashi-san!, voiced by Ryūichi Kijima.
  (Turk in River City Ransom, Wheels in Crash 'n the Boys: Street Challenge) – one of the "Four Devas" of Reihou Academy. Known for his quickness in combat.
  (Mojo in River City Ransom) – one of the "Four Devas" of Reihou Academy.
  (Blade in River City Ransom) – one of the "Four Devas" of Reihou Academy, he also controls Hakutaka Industries High School.
  (Ivan in River City Ransom, Sprecks in Crash 'n the Boys: Street Challenge) – student of Horyou High School, he guards the entry gates of Reihou Academy. Although a tough fighter, he has a kind heart and has a sense of justice.
  (Otis in River City Ransom) – guards the Gymnasium of Reihou Academy. He is the former Student President of Reihou Academy and leads the "Four Devas".
  (Tex in River City Ransom, Clint in Crash 'n the Boys: Street Challenge) – boss of Tanihana High School, he guards the school hallways leading to the floor where Mami is held. He admires Goda's persona. In other Kunio-kun games, he is a friend to both Kunio and Riki.
They are also known as the "Double Dragon Twins" due to not just their resemblance to Billy and Jimmy Lee, the protagonists of the Double Dragon games (being twin brothers, having the same special moves, and having the Double Dragon theme song played whenever they appeared), but also because of their names (Ryuichi and Ryuji can be translated as "First Dragon" and "Second Dragon"). They are the strongest fighters of Reihou Academy and are the fiercest opponents of Kunio and Riki. Aside from River City Ransom, the twins appeared in other Kunio games either as bosses or representing Reihou Academy as co-team captains.
  (Slick/Simon in River City Ransom, Skip in Crash 'n the Boys: Street Challenge) – the main antagonist of River City Ransom and former Student President of Reihou Academy, revealed to be Kunio's timid childhood friend before transferring schools. Yamada desires revenge on Kunio for overshadowing him and having the attention of Hasebe, whom he has a crush on. Having dabbled in the dark arts, he kidnaps Mami in a scheme of getting rid of Kunio and replacing him as the number one delinquent and the franchise's new main character. In other games, Yamada plays more of a comical sidekick to Todou and the stage 2 boss of River City Girls. Yamada is voiced by Wataru Takagi in the first two Downtown Nekketsu games for the PC Engine Super CD-ROM².

Nekketsu High School Dodge Ball Club: Soccer Story (Nintendo World Cup)
  – goalkeeper for Nekketsu High's Soccer Team. He and Misako sought Kunio's help in leading the team to the championship.
  – a 9th member of Nekketsu High's Soccer Team.
  – the last member of Nekketsu High's Soccer Team, who joins Kunio and his team after they won in semi-final match. He reappears in Shodai Nekketsu Kouha Kunio-kun as among the students visiting Osaka.
  – captain of Hattori Academy's Soccer Team from the semi-final match. He, and other team captains from the game, would later join Kunio to represent Japan in Nekketsu Soccer League. His handsome looks and superb skill has made him popular among female students. The same guy later returns in Super Sports Challenge as an unlocking team and again, reprises his role as the member of Nekketsu FC team in Soccer Hooligans. He also appears in Kunio-kun Special.

Downtown Nekketsu March: Super-Awesome Field Day!
  (Todd in Crash 'n the Boys: Street Challenge, Titus in River City Ransom EX) – the current Student President of Reihou Academy. A man of extreme wealth, he has a huge dislike for Kunio and makes attempts to humiliate him in Downtown Nekketsu Kōshinkyoku, and Crash n' The Boys Street Challenge. He is Yamada's superior after the latter surrendered his title of Student President to him in the aftermath of River City Ransom. Tōdō is voiced by Hikaru Midorikawa in Downtown Nekketsu Kōshinkyoku (PC Engine Super CD-ROM² version).
  (Cheese in Crash n' The Boys: Street Challenge, Gary in River City Ransom EX) – 2nd Year Student of Nekketsu High. Like Hiroshi, he is a friend of Kunio and looks up to him for inspiration. He becomes the protagonist in Downtown Nekketsu Baseball Monogatari as the leader of the Nekketsu High Baseball team.
  – 2nd Year Student of Nekketsu High. He is Sugata's classmate. In Baseball Monogatari, he becomes the vice-captain of the Nekketsu High Baseball team when Sugata replaces Tachibana as team captain.
  – Freshman from Nekketsu High and member of the school's Judo club.
  – another Freshman from Nekketsu High and a member of the school's Drama club.
 
  – 2nd Year Student of Nekketsu High. She is the school's cheerleader and is also a childhood friend of Sugata. Like many of the franchise's female characters, she too has an interest in Kunio. She is a playable character in Nekketsu! Beach Volley da yo: Kunio-kun.
  (Nate in Crash n' The Boys: Street Challenge) – 2nd Year Student of Hanazono High. He is known for his handsome looks and is Sugata's rival.
  (Rick in River City Ransom EX) – 3rd Year student of Hanazono High and former rival of Riki.
  (Dove in Crash n' The Boys: Street Challenge)
 
 
  (Knors in Crash n' the Boys: Street Challenge, Jesse in River City Ransom EX) – a student of Reihou Academy and a close friend of Shun Mochizuki.
 
  – 2nd Year student of Reihou Academy and is the team's Cheerleader. She has an older sister named Megumi, who is an art teacher at Nekketsu High.
  (Barns in Crash n' The Boys Street Challenge, Ted in River City Ransom EX) – a member of the Judo club from Torashima Industries IV High School. He is in his 3rd Year.
  (Milo in Crash n' The Boys: Street Challenge) – 2nd Year student of Hayabusa High.
  – 2nd Year student of Horyo High and is the cheerleader of the School Alliance team. She has a close relationship with the Gouda siblings.

Shodai Nekketsu Kōha Kunio-kun
  – the main antagonist of Shodai. An exchange student from Osaka studying at Nekketsu High, he invites Kunio and the gang to Osaka as part of a school trip during their second year. After Hiroshi was beaten by the students of Union at early in the game, Yoshihiro joins the Osaka Alliance to avenge him. However, it is later revealed that Yoshihiro is a new leader of Osaka Student Union and the mastermind behind who obey the gang to dominate and taking over Japan. After he betrayed both Nekketsu High and Osaka Alliance, he is also revealed to be responsible for locked Union's old leader and orders Urabe (from Ebisu High) to capture Miho during the sewer basement.
 Miho Yanagisawa – 2nd year student of Sakurakyou High School. A friend of Hiroshi's, she warns Kunio of the Osaka Student Union, a gang of juvenile delinquents, and their plan to take over Japan.
 Masaki Yanagisawa – one of the four Osaka Student Union's heavenly kings, and Miho's older brother.

Go Go! Nekketsu Hockey Club: Slip-and-Slide Madness
 Yōichi – he is the team captain of Nekketsu High's Hockey Team. He seeks Kunio's help in improving and strengthening the Hockey Team and win the championship. He also makes a cameo appearance in the opening intro of Nekketsu Kakutō Densetsu.
 Kaori – reporter for Nekketsu High's school newspaper. She provides reports of the Hockey Team's progress in the game and is secretly in love with Yoichi.
 Tooru – captain of Nekketsu High's Kendo Club.
 Youko – captain of the Yurikaoka Hockey Club as well as the Association of Magic. A hard working student, she is a good friend of Kunio and accepts the latter's challenge to a hockey match.
  – captain of the Daisetsuzan High School Hockey Club. He and his team fought against Team Nekketsu during the final match in Scenario Mode. His extraordinary skill allowed him to be drafted as a professional player for the Canadian Team. This character would later appear in Super Sports Challenge, and Kunio-Kun Special.

Surprise! Nekketsu New Records! The Distant Gold Medal / Crash 'n The Boys: Street Challenge
  – student and captain of the Oklahoma High School team. He reappears in Nekketsu Dunk Heroes as one of the participants and as a friend to Kunio and Riki.
  – an African American student of the Oklahoma High School team and Johnny's co captain.
  – also a student of the Oklahoma High School team. He shares the same sprite and moveset as the Hattori Twins, though with a different color. In Super Sports Challenge, his design was completely different rather than shares as Hattori Twins. It is unknown if he is actually Jimmy Lee, one of the protagonists of Double Dragon.
 Kounosuke Todou – father of Mamoru Todou and President of the Toudou Group. Upon hearing of his son's defeat by Kunio, Kounosuke helped organize the tournament in Bikkuri Nekketsu Shin Kiroku.

Nekketsu Fighting Legend
 Toraichi and Toraji – they head the tournament in Nekketsu Kakutou Densetsu waiting to fight the strongest opponents in the game. They are also called the "Double Tiger Brothers" and "Saber Tigers" because of them being both twins and wear Tiger Masks in combat. They later show up in Super Sports Challenge as the captains of Martial Arts team, and Kunio-kun Special. Before arrived in Modern-era, they also make a small cameo appearance in Kunio no Oden in the Vs. Mode screen.

Downtown Nekketsu Baseball Monogatari
  – an honor student and a superb athlete, he is the team captain of Nekketsu High's Baseball team. An injury on his shoulder bars him from leading Nekketsu High to Japan's National High School Baseball Tournament. This serves as a catalyst for Sugata to take his place as team captain.
  – Rika is referred to by her given name. She is the team manager of Nekketsu High's Baseball team and is Tatsumi's girlfriend. News of Tatsumi's injury leaves her heartbroken and unable to fulfill her duties as team manager. This motivates Sugata, who has a crush on her, to lead the Nekketsu team in the baseball tournament.
  (Shel in River City Ransom EX) – Kuniko is referred to by her given name. She takes over Rika's place as team manager of Nekketsu High's Baseball team. She is also Kunio's biggest fan and chases him whenever the opportunity arises. She has a rivalry with Hasebe.
  – 3rd Year student of Horyo Academy. His flowing violet hair and skills with the sword earned him the nickname "The Beautiful Swordsman". Gouda's sister, Saori, is in love with him.
  – 3rd Year student of Fukubu Academy. He is Murasaki's childhood friend as well as his rival in terms of skills with the sword. His skill in the martial arts also rivals that of the Hattori Twins.
  – Freshman student of Fukubu Academy. He is the younger brother of Shun Mochizuki, one of the bosses in River City Ransom.

Downtown Nekketsu Monogatari EX (River City Ransom EX)
  (Rex in River City Ransom EX) – a member of Torashima Industries IV High School's Cheerleading Club.
  (Abby in River City Ransom EX) – Saori is referred to by her given name. She is a younger sister of Tsuyoshi Gōda.
 Shōko (Jenny in River City Ransom EX)

Kunio-kun no Chou Nekketsu! Daiundoukai
 Michael Tobioka – the founder of the Tobioka Conglomerate, who sends a challenging letter to Kunio after reading about him on the Internet. He later appears in Soccer Hooligans alongside Sierra and Stanislav. 
  – an idol working for Arc TV.
  – an aide of Michael Tobioka.
 Stanislav – a scientist working for Tobioka Conglomerate.

Nekketsu Kōha Kunio-Kun Special
 Yuya & Toshio – students of Class 2-E from Nekketsu High. They are first seen bullying Hiroshi at the back of the school in the beginning of the game. After suffering defeat by Kunio twice, they seek help from Hanazono High.
 Madoka – Kunio's teacher from Nekketsu High.
 Kouchyo – principal of Nekketsu High.
 Wataru – the No.2 man of Hanazono High. He is approached by Yuya and Toshio who seek help in defeating Kunio.

Riki Densetsu
 Sakata – 3rd Year Student of Hanazono High, serves as a subordinate of Riki.
 Megumi & Gonda – teachers of Hanazono High.
 Mikoto – a subordinate of Shinji and member of the Blue Emperor gang.
 Okada – leader of the "Mushamonzen" (武赦紋漸) gang consisting of 50 people, he is believed to be responsible for Riki's frame-up in the game.

Nekketsu Kōha Kunio-Kun SP: Rantō Kyōsōkyoku (River City: Tokyo Rumble)
 Shirogane – member of the Tokyo Lion Alliance who holds the title "Silver Lion". He originally ran in Shinji's Blue Emperors until his close friend died in a motorcycle crash.
 Oda – member of the Tokyo Lion Alliance who holds the title "Demon Lion". A muscular man wearing a hockey mask, Oda does not talk much but lets his strength speak for itself.
 Benibayashi – member of the Tokyo Lion Alliance who holds the title "Rouge Lion". The only female leader, she uses her beauty and ballerina-trained movements to beguile enemies.
 Ukyo Azuma & Sakyo Azuma – members of the Tokyo Lion Alliance who hold the title "Twin Lions". They are identical twins (save for Ukyo's facial scar) who move and fight in perfect sync.
 Kaneda – member of the Tokyo Lion Alliance who holds the title "Gold Lion". A successful businessman with a love for fighting, he joined the Lion Alliance solely for personal amusement.
 Shigematsu – leader of the Tokyo Lion Alliance who holds the title "Ultra Lion". He plans to lead the Lion Alliance into ruling all of Tokyo.
 Lee – Sabu's older brother, who runs the Triads in Hong Kong. He and Sabu orchestrate a plan to get revenge on Kunio for his previous humiliation of the Sanwakai by establishing the Tokyo Lion Alliance.

River City Girls series
 Hibari: A fashion designer who runs a clothing line in Uptown. She dons a Gothic-themed Kimono as her outfit and is the game's 3rd boss.
 Noize: A rock star who Kyoko befriended in the past and is the game's 5th boss. Her real name is Nozomi.
 Marian Kelly: A character from the Double Dragon series, a student and love interest of the martial twins William "Billy" Lee and James "Jimmy" Lee before she worked out to cease being their damsel in distress. She joins Misako and Kyōko after they snapped her out of the yakuza's brainwashing.
 Provie: A character originally introduced from River City Ransom: Underground. She attacks Misako and Kyōko after mistaking them as Sabu's henchmen and believing they kidnapped her friend Chris. After Misako and Kyōko defeat her and clear up the misunderstanding, Provie joins them to help free River City from the Yakuza.
 Tsuiko: An influencer that Sabu's gang paid to hack into Misako and Kyōko's accounts.
 Blaire: An anti-social witch that Sabu's gang paid to brainwash people into doing their dirty work.
 Primo: A famous celebrity chef hired by Sabu's gang to cook special food to mind control the students of River City High.

Manga
A gag manga based on the video games was produced titled . The manga was illustrated by Kosaku Anakubo and was serialized in the monthly anthology CoroCoro Comic from 1991 to 1996, lasting 11 collected editions. Ore wa Otoko Da! was awarded the Shogakukan Manga Award for children's manga in 1995.

References

External links
 Kunio-kun series portal at Arc System Works 
 Kunio-kun series at Jap-Sai
 Miracle Kidz – a dōjin soft developing team founded by Mitsuhiro Yoshida and Hiroyuki Sekimoto, the original developers of the Downtown Nekketsu series 
 Yoshihisa Kishimoto's personal website  

 
Arc System Works franchises
Shogakukan manga
Shōnen manga
Video game franchises
Video game franchises introduced in 1986
Winners of the Shogakukan Manga Award for children's manga
Nintendo Switch Online games